is a Japanese professional footballer who last played as a left-back for Orion Tip Sereď in the Fortuna Liga.

Playing career
Itsuki Urata joined to J2 League club; JEF United Chiba in 2015. In September 2016, he moved to J3 League club FC Ryukyu.

In August 2020, Urata joined Croatian First Football League club NK Varaždin

Club statistics
Updated to 23 February 2018.

References

External links

Profile at JEF United Chiba
Profile at FC Ryukyu 
Profile at Giravanz Kitakyushu

1997 births
Living people
Association football people from Tokyo
Association football defenders
Japanese footballers
Japanese expatriate footballers
Japan youth international footballers
JEF United Chiba players
FC Ryukyu players
Giravanz Kitakyushu players
J.League U-22 Selection players
FC Zorya Luhansk players
NK Varaždin players
ŠKF Sereď players
J2 League players
J3 League players
Croatian Football League players
Expatriate footballers in Ukraine
Expatriate footballers in Croatia
Expatriate footballers in Slovakia
Japanese expatriate sportspeople in Croatia
Japanese expatriate sportspeople in Slovakia
Japanese expatriate sportspeople in Ukraine